Rinn or RINN may refer to:

 Rinn, a village in Austria, famous for its district Judenstein
 (Recommended) International Nonproprietary Name